David Weiss may refer to:

Music 
 David Weiss (musician) (born 1964), jazz trumpeter, composer, and arranger
 David Was (born 1952), stage name of David Weiss, American musician and producer

Writers 
 David Weiss (novelist) (1909–2002), author of Naked Came I
 David N. Weiss (born 1960), American screenwriter, executive in the Writers Guild of America
 David S. Weiss (fl. 1995), American comedy writer, radio sidekick for Dennis Miller

Other 
 David Weiss (1946–2012), of duo Peter Fischli & David Weiss, Swiss multi-media artist
 David C. Weiss (born 1956), United States Attorney for the United States District Court for the District of Delaware
 David Solomon Weiss (born 1953), organizational psychologist and business strategist
 David Weiss Halivni (born 1927), scholar and professor of Jewish studies and the Talmud
 David Weiss (2009 fictional person), false name used by a Norwegian man to contact journalists, including Haviv Rettig Gur, to spread rumours about antisemitism in Norway